Neothrips is a genus of thrips in the family Phlaeothripidae.

Species
 Neothrips corticis
 Neothrips lepidus
 Neothrips obesus

References

Phlaeothripidae
Thrips
Thrips genera